New York City's 9th City Council district is one of 51 districts in the New York City Council. It is currently represented by Democrat Kristin Richardson Jordan, who took office in 2022.

Geography
District 9 is based in Harlem in upper Manhattan, also covering smaller parts of East Harlem, Hamilton Heights, and Manhattanville. St. Nicholas Park and Marcus Garvey Park are both located in the district.

The district overlaps with Manhattan Community Boards 9, 10, and 11, and is contained entirely within New York's 13th congressional district. It also overlaps with the 29th, 30th, and 31st districts of the New York State Senate, and with the 68th, 69th, 70th, and 71st districts of the New York State Assembly.

With its population base in Harlem, the 9th district is the only plurality-Black district in Manhattan, and is home to what has historically been among the most politically active Black communities in the nation. Since Robert Jackson left office in 2013, the district has been the only one in the borough to be represented by a Black councilmember.

Recent election results

2021
In 2019, voters in New York City approved Ballot Question 1, which implemented ranked-choice voting in all local elections. Under the new system, voters have the option to rank up to five candidates for every local office. Voters whose first-choice candidates fare poorly will have their votes redistributed to other candidates in their ranking until one candidate surpasses the 50 percent threshold. If one candidate surpasses 50 percent in first-choice votes, then ranked-choice tabulations will not occur.

2017

2017 special
In 2016, Councilwoman Inez Dickens was elected to the 70th district of the New York State Assembly, triggering a February 2017 special election for her seat. Like all municipal special elections in New York City, the race was officially nonpartisan, with all candidates running on ballot lines of their own creation.

2013

References

New York City Council districts